Many transit agencies serve Southern California. They range from large organizations serving thousands of people to one-route services provided by local cities. The majority of these agencies mainly serve localized areas of Los Angeles County. In many cases, some agencies bus routes overlap in the same area with other bus agencies.

Alhambra Community Transit 
The city of Alhambra operates two transit routes with the ACT system. The Green Line runs as a city loop, with Valley Blvd and Main St as the key arteries of travel. This route runs six days per week in both a clockwise and counterclockwise direction. The Blue Line runs on weekdays from the Alhambra Civic Center to California State University, Los Angeles and the Cal State MetroLink Station.

Antelope Valley Transit Authority 
Antelope Valley Transit Authority is the local transit agency serving the cities of Palmdale, Lancaster and Northern Los Angeles. It also provides commuter express service between the Antelope Valley and Downtown Los Angeles, the San Fernando Valley or the Century City/Westwood/UCLA area.

Arcadia Transit 
The city of Arcadia operates fixed route and curb-to-curb service that is open to the general public and travels around the city limits. Connects with the Metro L Line (Gold) at the Arcadia Station and serves The Shops at Santa Anita and LA County Arboretum.

Atascadero Transit 
Since 1979, the city of Atascadero has provided dial-a-ride service. Over the last decade, this has been complemented by one fixed route, the North County Shuttle. Six days per week, this line connects Atascadero, Paso Robles and Cuesta College.

Baldwin Park Transit 
Three routes provide local transportation in Baldwin Park. The City Shuttle provides a clockwise loop through the suburb seven days per week. On weekdays, the Teal Line and Pumpkin Line let residents access the Metrolink Station, avoiding costly parking fees. The Teal Line runs through northern areas of the city; the Pumpkin line runs through southern portions.

Beach Cities Transit 
Beach Cities Transit provides local bus service in the coastal cities of Redondo Beach, Hermosa Beach, Manhattan Beach, and El Segundo in Los Angeles County.

Bellflower Bus 
Six days per week, local bus service is provided through Bellflower.  Two loops are contained in the system, each covering a different half of the city.  The North route services the northern half of the city, primarily running along Bellflower Boulevard, Somerset Ave., and Rosecrans Ave.  The South route provides service to the south end of the city, running along Lakewood Blvd., Artesia Blvd., and Woodruff Ave. Service is provided every half-hour between the hours of 7 A.M. and 5 P.M.

Bell Gardens Trolley 
The city of Bell Gardens features one bus route, a clockwise city loop that runs Monday through Saturday. The service operates approximately once every 20 minutes until 5:30pm.

Big Blue Bus 
Big Blue Bus runs 20 routes, primarily serves the city of Santa Monica and the greater westside region of Los Angeles County.

Calabasas Public Transportation 
The City of Calabasas operates a citywide bus and several peak hour buses. On Friday through Sunday, a tourist trolley runs through Calabasas, California. It makes an approximately one-hour loop from the historic Old Town to the retail-dominated Highlands area.

Camarillo Area Transit 
Camarillo's transit system, Camarillo Area Transit (CAT), is built around one fixed route and a dial-a-ride system. The standard line runs as a loop from city hall to Leisure Village Road. The City of Camarillo has contracted operations and maintenance of its transit system to RATP Dev.

Cerritos on Wheels 
The City of Cerritos owns a fleet of federally funded buses known as Cerritos On Wheels (or COW), which has stops throughout the city. The acronym, "COW," is a tribute to the City's origins as Dairy Valley, when cows outnumbered residents. The propane fueled COW also connects to Long Beach Transit, Orange County Transportation Authority, Norwalk Transit or Los Angeles MTA buses at overlapping stops on the borders of the city. Wi-Fi Internet access is also accessible on the buses. Route 1 loops along the east side of town between 166th Street and Del Amo Boulevard, while Route 2 travels in western portions of the municipality from Cerritos College to the civic center.

City of Bell Transportation 
City of Bell Transportation operates La Campana Shuttle in Bell, Cudahy, and Bell Gardens. It also operates Dial-a-Ride and Dial-a-Cab service.

City of Santa Clarita Transit 
City of Santa Clarita Transit operates local bus service in Santa Clarita and nearby surrounding unincorporated areas of Northern Los Angeles, along with commuter express service between Santa Clarita and Downtown Los Angeles, the San Fernando Valley or the Century City/Westwood/UCLA area.

Compton Renaissance Transit 
The city of Compton has a local bus system. All five lines terminate at the transit center in downtown. Route 1 runs along Rosecrans Ave and El Segundo Blvd. Route 2 travels along Acadia Ave and Alondra Blvd. Route 3 provides access to the city's large retail development known as the Fashion Center and travels along El Segundo Blvd and Santa Fe Ave.  Route 4 serves residences and facilities along Compton Blvd and Alondra Blvd. Finally, Route 5 travels to MLK Hospital and allows for light rail transfers at Artesia Station.

Corona Cruiser 
The city of Corona features two routes that operate Monday through Saturday. Each line connects with the North Main Metrolink Station. The Blue Line travels from the McKinley Street shopping centers, south to Mountain Gate Park, and north along Main Street before ending in the River Road/Parkridge Avenue residential areas. The Red Line runs from a residential quarter on Border Avenue, to Main Street in downtown, and eventually to The Crossings shopping center on Cajalco Road.

Cudahy Area Rapid Transit 

Despite the agency's name, this service for the city of Cudahy does not provide express transit; rather, it consists of a local dial-a-ride system.

DowneyLINK 
Four loops, one serving each quadrant of the city, provide local bus service in Downey, California. Service operates five days per week, with each line ending at Downey Depot, a major LACMTA transfer center. The Northwest route is a northwest loop, running along streets such as Brookshire Ave and Telegraph Rd. The northeastern portion of the city gains service from the Northeast route running along streets such as Lakewood Blvd and Heldon Ave. Southeastern areas in the city are served by the Southeast route, which features primary streets such as Bellflower Ave and Foster Ave. The Southwest route services the southwestern segment of Downey, with Rives Ave and Imperial Blvd as major streets.

Duarte Transit 
Fixed route bus service was established in Duarte, California in 1984. A city loop is provided by the Blue and Green Line, which run clockwise and counterclockwise respectively. These routes run on weekdays until 7pm. During weekday peak hours, the Commuter Line runs from Hacienda Dr to a transfer point on Mountain Ave, which allows Downtown Los Angeles workers from all portions of the city to have easy access to the LACMTA and Foothill Transit express buses.

Easy Rider Shuttle 
The city of Paramount features a pair of interlined bus loops, with Route 1 traveling clockwise and Route 2 following the opposite path. Buena Vida Road and Downey Avenue serve as the respective major western and eastern streets that are traversed, while buses wind through various streets in between.

El Monte Transit 
Servicing the city of El Monte, El Monte Transit runs 5 fixes routes 7 days a week and 2 shuttle routes Monday-Friday.

Fillmore Area Transit (FAT) 
Formerly providing service around and commuter services from Fillmore.  Maintains an address at 234 Central Avenue, selling tickets for VISTA.  Apparently has given way a Dial-a-Ride services now operated by VISTA.

Foothill Transit 
Foothill Transit operates fixed-route bus services in 22 member cities in the San Gabriel and Pomona valleys in eastern Los Angeles County.

Gateway Coach 
The city of Sierra Madre operates one route under the name Gateway Coach.

Glendora Transportation Division 
The city of Glendora operates three shuttle routes. The Gold Line Commuter Shuttle offers service between the APU/Citrus College station and two parking lots at the Transit Plaza (North Route) and the Teen & Family Center (South Route) from 5 to 9 am and 4:30 to 8 pm on weekdays. The Metrolink Commuter Shuttle operates between the Transit Plaza and the Covina station from 5 to 8 am and 4 and 7pm on weekdays. Additionally, during the school days, the city operates a Midday Shuttle taking students from middle and high schools campuses to Downtown Glendora, the library, and the Teen & Family Center.

GO WEST Transit 
Three routes are provided by this agency for West Covina. The Red Line serves the eastern portion of the city, using Workman Avenue as a major street in its journey as it provides service to both the Eastland Center and Plaza West Covina. The circuit winds back to its beginning by passing the city's high school and Cortez Park. Western areas of the town are served by the more tightly routed Blue Line, which begins by travelling along Sunset and Lark Ellen Avenues in the northern sectors of the municipality, before looping through the city center. The Green Line is the only non-loop in the system, as it heads south from Cortez Park through hilly suburbs using Nogales Street as a main thoroughfare

Guadalupe Transit 
The city of Guadalupe operates the Guadalupe Shuttle, the Guadalupe Flyer to Santa Maria and ADA service.

Huntington Park Express 
The city of Huntington Park operates a single shuttle route called Huntington Park Express or HP Express. Service is provided Monday through Saturday on a loop that winds around the city every 25 minutes.

Irvine Shuttle 
The city of Irvine operates four weekday commuter shuttles serving major employers, residential areas, shopping centers, and transportation facilities.  Two lines, Route A and Route B, connect the Tustin Metrolink Station to the Irvine Business Complex area. Route A provides service between the Tustin Metrolink Station and John Wayne Airport with stops along Von Karman Avenue.  Route B heads along Jamboree Road before continuing through Main Street and Michelson Drive.  The remaining two lines, Route C and  Route D, offer connections between Irvine Station and the Irvine Spectrum Area, which includes major employers, the Irvine Spectrum Center, and residential communities The Park and The Village.  Route C follows Irvine Center Drive and ends at the Capital Group campus, while Route D serves the Irvine Spectrum Center, Kaiser Permanente – Irvine Medical Center, and Hoag Hospital Irvine.

La Puente Link 
La Puente is served by a single shuttle loop, which was established in 2001. The route winds through the city, heading as far north as Hacienda Boulevard, as far west as Puente Avenue, and as far east as Guzman Avenue.

Lawndale Beat 
In the city of Lawndale, two shuttle routes are provided, each of which serves the Redondo Beach light rail station in the adjacent city of Redondo Beach. The Residential Route winds through the city between the South Bay Galleria and Rosecrans Avenue, serving various side streets. The Express Route travels directly from the Galeria along Hawthorne Boulevard and Marine Avenue to the train station.

Long Beach Transit 
Long Beach Transit runs 39 fixed routes, serving city of Long Beach and surrounding areas.

Los Angeles County Metropolitan Transportation Authority (Metro) 
The Los Angeles County Metropolitan Transportation Authority (branded as Metro) operates bus, light rail, heavy rail and bus rapid transit services in Los Angeles County. It also provides funding and directs planning for rail and freeway projects within Los Angeles County, funding 27 local transit agencies as well as paratransit services.

Los Angeles Department of Transportation (Commuter Express and DASH) 
The Los Angeles Department of Transportation operates transit and paratransit services within the City of Los Angeles, including Commuter Express and DASH bus services, and the CityRide Paratransit Service.

Commuter Express is a rush hour express bus service. Most Commuter Express serve Downtown Los Angeles, with others to jobs centers in Pasadena, El Segundo, Century City, and Long Beach.

DASH operates over 30 shuttle routes in Downtown Los Angeles and other neighborhoods within the city, complementing Metro's longer bus routes, rail lines and bus rapid transit corridors.

Lynwood Breeze 
Lynwood features four local bus lines. Route A provides a short inner loop that connects with the Long Beach light rail station, with Bullis Road and Long Beach Boulevard as major streets. Atlantic Avenue and East Imperial Highway are major streets of Route B, which serves Atlantic Crossings Shopping Center. Route C serves St. Francis Medical Center while traversing a southernly loop, while Route D travels from the hospital to Imperial/Wilmington/Rosa Parks light rail station.

Monrovia Transit 
The main portion of Monrovia's transit service iscentered around one fixed line and dial-a-ride system. The Old Town Trolley travels along Huntington and Mountain Boulevards on weekdays.

Moorpark City Transit 
The city of Moorpark features two bus routes. Route 1 begins at city hall then winds through the city center, toward Mountain Meadows Plaza in the south, before ending at Villa del Arroyo in the northeastern part of town. Route 2 also begins at city hall and ends just north of Route 1's terminus at Moorpark College, traveling through a more centralized path than its counterpart.

Norwalk Transit 
Norwalk Transit runs 6 routes primarily servicing city of Norwalk and other surrounding cities.

Palo Verde Valley Transit Agency 
Centered around the city of Blythe, the Palo Verde Valley is serviced by this agency, which brands itself as The Desert Roadrunner. Route 1 City Circulator functions as a clockwise loop around Blythe, starting at city hall along Broadway and using 14th Ave, Barnard St, and Riverside Dr. as major streets. Route 2 Palo Verde College runs from Palo Verde Community College to the city center and then to Intake Blvd. via Hobsonway. Route 4 Mesa Verde/Ripley goes from Intake Blvd. via Hobsonway to the farming community of Ripley and then to Mesa Verde, before heading back to Blythe via Hobsonway. On weekday peak hours, Route 3 Express serves several California State Prisons, a major local employer, traveling along I-10 to their location in Wiley's Well.

Palos Verdes Peninsula Transit Authority 

The Palos Verdes Peninsula Transit Authority is primary provider of mass transportation in the Los Angeles suburbs of Rancho Palos Verdes, Palos Verdes Estates, Rolling Hills, and Rolling Hills Estates, California.

Pasadena Transit 
Pasadena Transit runs 8 routes servicing the city of Pasadena.

Paso Express 
On Monday through Saturday, the city of Paso Robles features a loop bus service. The line runs along Spring St and Riverside Blvd as major streets on the west bank of the Salinas River, while Creston Rd and Ramboulliet Rd are primary east bank highways.

Pomona Valley Transportation Authority 
Serves the cities of Pomona, Claremont, LaVerne, and San Dimas. Programs include the Pomona Valley Get About program for seniors and disabled, Claremont Dial-a-Ride for all ages, Pomona Group Services, and San Dimas Dial-a-Cab for all ages.

Rosemead Explorer 
The municipality of Rosemead operates two interlined bus lines, with Route 1 running clockwise and Route 2 traveling over the same area counterclockwise. The main termini of the loop are Montebello Town Center and Rosemead Square, with Walnut Grove and Garvey Avenue serving as major streets.

San Fernando Trolley 
One circular fixed route, the result of consolidating two former fixed routes.

Santa Barbara Metropolitan Transit District 
The Santa Barbara Metropolitan Transit District (MTD) is a public transit agency providing bus service in the southern portion of Santa Barbara County, California. It serves the cities of Santa Barbara, Carpinteria, and Goleta as well as the unincorporated areas of Montecito, Summerland, and Isla Vista.

Santa Paula Commuter Bus 
One fixed route and a dial-a-ride service in Santa Paula.  Operated by VISTA.

Santa Ynez Valley Transit 
This agency provides service to the communities of Buellton, Solvang, Santa Ynez, and Los Olivos, California. Route A provides a clockwise route through above communities, using Route 246 as its main thoroughfare, while Route B travels in the opposite direction.

Simi Valley Transit 
The city of Simi Valley contains a four-line bus service, running Monday through Saturday. Route A services Simi Valley Town Center and the Metrolink Station, with Cochran St, Royal Ave, and Los Angeles Ave as major thoroughfares. Route B runs an extended version of Route A, running past the same locales mentioned above, before deviating to travel further west on Cochran and Royal. Route C begins its route at city hall and services the Simi Valley Metrolink station and the Chatsworth Station. Los Angeles Ave and Topanga Canyon Blvd are primary streets for this route. Route D begins at the Ronald Reagan Presidential Library, travels to Simi Valley Town Center, and ends at the Simi Valley Civic Center, with featured major streets including Madera Rd, First St, and Alamo St.

South Pasadena Gold Link 
Weekday bus-to-train shuttle service is provided by the city of South Pasadena. Buses travel into various quadrants of the city from the South Pasadena light rail station. The Yellow Route uses Orange Grove and Fair Oaks Avenues to serve the northern portion of the city, while the Pink Route uses Oak Street and Wilmington Drive as major streets heading south. Similarly, the Red Route heads east along Monterrey Road to Garfield Avenue, and the Blue Route winds into the hills along Camino del Sol and Via del Ray. This free service is provided during rush hours only.

Sunshine Shuttle 
South Whittier features a single bus line. The route begins in the east at Whittwood Town Center before winding toward Mayberry Park and the Gateway Plaza Office Park; the line then heads to Sorensen Library, where it ends.

Thousand Oaks Transit 
Provides public transportation services throughout Thousand Oaks, California and Newbury Park, California. Ventura County transportation website

Torrance Transit 
Torrance Transit runs 13 routes, primarily serving South Bay region of Los Angeles County.

West Hollywood Cityline 
Marketed as a supplemental service, a pair of interlined loops travel the main streets of West Hollywood. The Eastbound Orange Route starts near Cedars Sinai Medical Center then winding alongside streets as it routinely provides service to amenities off the mainlines of North San Vicente and Santa Monica Boulevards. The Westbound Blue Route heads West from the Gateway Center at La Brea and Santa Monica Boulevard. Cityline is mostly a paratransit service, but everyone can ride it for free. In every direction, the buses go in frequencies of 30 min. (as listed in the timetable). Cityline's transit hours are: Monday-Saturday from 9:00 AM to 6:00 PM
(no transit service on Sundays or holidays)

References

External links 
Arcadia Transit
Alhambra Community Transit
Atascadero Transit
Baldwin Park Transit
Bellflower Bus
Bell Gardens Trolley
Calabasas Trolley
Cerritos on Wheels (COW)
CityLine (West Hollywood)
COMBI (Huntington Park)
Corona Cruiser
DowneyLINK
Duarte Transit
Easy Rider (Paramount)
GO WEST (West Covina)
(Pomona Valley Transportation Authority)
Gold Link (South Pasadena)
Irvine Shuttle
LCF Shuttle
La Puente Link
Lawndale Beat
Monrovia Transit
Moorpark City Transit
Palo Verde Valley Transit
Paso Express
Port of L.A. Waterfront Rail Car
Rosemead Explorer
San Fernando Trolley
Santa Ynez Valley Transit
Simi Valley Transit
Sunshine Shuttle (South Whittier)
VISTA Dial-a-ride services for Fillmore, Piru and Santa Paula

 
 
 
Sou
Small Southern California transit agencies
Public transportation in Los Angeles County, California
Public transportation in Imperial County, California
Public transportation in Kern County, California
Public transportation in Orange County, California
Public transportation in Riverside County, California
Public transportation in San Bernardino County, California
Public transportation in San Diego County, California
Public transportation in San Luis Obispo County, California
Public transportation in Santa Barbara County, California
Public transportation in Ventura County, California